Christian Cole is a Sierra Leonean football coach.

Career
Cole has had four spells in charge of the national team.

In January 2011, Minister of  Employment, Youth and Sports Paul Kamara removed Cole from the managership, replacing him with Swedish coach Lars-Olof Mattsson. The incident sparked a feud between Kamara's ministry and the SLFA, which preferred Cole.

References

Year of birth missing (living people)
Living people
Sierra Leonean football managers
Sierra Leone national football team managers